Meredith Brook is a tributary of the Lackawanna River in Susquehanna County, Lackawanna County, and Wayne County, in Pennsylvania, in the United States. In the early 1900s, the stream was clear in its lower reaches despite receiving water from a borehole and culm banks. There are two shallow lakes in the watershed: Lake Erie and Kennedy Pond. Various fish inhabit the lakes.

Course
Meredith Brook begins in a lake in Forest City. It flows southwest for several hundred feet, almost immediately entering Clifford Township. The stream then turns south for a short distance, crossing Pennsylvania Route 247 before turning east and reentering Forest City. In Forest City, it passes through another lake and reenters Clifford Township. From the southwestern end of the lake, the stream flows southwest for a few hundred feet before turning south-southeast for a short distance, exiting Susquehanna County and entering Vandling, in Lackawanna County. Upon entering Vandling, it turns east and then northeast, reentering Forest City and Susquehanna County after a few tenths of a mile. Once in Forest City, it turns east for a short distance before turning north-northeast. After a short distance, the stream crosses Pennsylvania Route 171 and turns east-northeast. A short distance further downstream, it reaches its confluence with the Lackawanna River.

Meredith Brook joins the Lackawanna River  upriver of its mouth.

Hydrology
In the early 1900s, Meredith Brook was clear in its lower reaches. However, water from some culm banks at the Forest City Colliery drained into the stream. Mine water from a borehole was also pumped directly into the stream. However, the stream was free of pollution of any variety upstream of the No. 2 Shaft.

Geography and geology

In the early 1900s, Meredith Brook was troughed under mining railroad tracks or rock and culm banks in some reaches. However, its streambed was in good condition and free of debris. The steam's streambanks were "well-formed", preventing wash. It is a small tributary stream.

Watershed and biology
Meredith Brook is entirely within the United States Geological Survey quadrangle of Forest City. The stream flows through three counties.

Lakes in the watershed of Meredith Brook include Kennedy Pond and Lake Erie, both of which are in the western part of the borough of Forest City.

Meredith Brook is a first-order stream. In the early 1900s, a reservoir on the stream was owned by the Pennsylvania Coal Company and used to supply drinking water to collieries.

Panfish occur within Kennedy Pond, in the watershed of Meredith Brook. Such fish also occur in Lake Erie, as do pickerel and bass.

History
Meredith Brook was entered into the Geographic Names Information System on January 1, 1990. Its identifier in the Geographic Names Information System is 1202341.

See also
Clarks Creek (Lackawanna River), next tributary of the Lackawanna River going upriver
Brace Brook, next tributary of the Lackawanna River going upriver
List of rivers of Pennsylvania
List of tributaries of the Lackawanna River

References

Rivers of Susquehanna County, Pennsylvania
Rivers of Lackawanna County, Pennsylvania
Rivers of Wayne County, Pennsylvania
Tributaries of the Lackawanna River
Rivers of Pennsylvania